The 2020 Cook Islands Round Cup (also known as Vans Premiership due to sponsorship reasons) is the 47th recorded edition of the Cook Islands Round Cup, the top association football league of the Cook Islands organised by the Cook Islands Football Association. The season began on 14 August 2020 with six teams from the island of Rarotonga competing in triple round-robin format. Tupapa Maraerenga are the defending champions, having won the league for three straight years. The champions of the league will qualify for the 2021 OFC Champions League.

Teams
Avatiu
Matavera
Nikao Sokattak
Puaikura
Titikaveka
Tupapa Maraerenga

League table

References

Cook Islands Round Cup seasons
Cook Islands